Seal, Shil, Shill, Sil, Silsharma, Shillsharma, is a Bengali Hindu family name. It literally means the quality of being devoted.

Notable people 
 Mutty Lall Seal (1792–1854), Indian entrepreneur and philanthropist
 Brajendra Nath Seal (1864–1938), Indian philosopher
 Sudhangshu Seal (born 1945), Indian politician
 Arindam Sil (born 1964), Indian actor, producer and director
 Aditya Seal (born 1988), Indian actor

References 

Bengali Hindu surnames